Ziarat Kola (also Romanized as Zīārat Kolā, Zeyārat Kolā, and Zīārat Kalā; also known as Zīārat Kūlā) is a village in Zarem Rud Rural District, Hezarjarib District, Neka County, Mazandaran Province, Iran. At the 2006 census, its population was 423, in 94 families.

References 

Populated places in Neka County